This is a list in alphabetical order of cricketers who have played for Lankan Cricket Club in first-class matches. Where there is an article, the link comes before the club career span, and the scorecard name (typically initials and surname) comes after. If no article is present, the scorecard name comes before the span.

G
 Iwanka Sanjula (2016–17) : P. I. S. Gamage

S	
 D. Salgado (2013–14)
 S. Salgado (2012–13 to 2013–14)
 S. D. Salgadu (2013–14)
 K. Samantha (2003–04)
 D. A. Y. L. Samarasinghe (2016–17 to 2017–18)
 J. P. R. Sampath (2012–13)
 S. I. K. Sandalanka (2012–13)
 R. S. Sayer (2022)
 Dinesh Seneviratne (2005–06) : D. Seneviratne
 W. V. D. Seneviratne (2022)
 S. Shaheed (2003–04)
 W. D. P. Shamitha (2007–08)
 Waruna Shantha (2005–06 to 2009–10) : G. A. L. W. Shantha
 S. Sharif (2013–14)
 S. Shashika (2014–15)
 J. S. M. Shazmil (2007–08)
 Nuwan Shiroman (2006–07 to 2007–08) : P. S. A. N. Shiroman
 Hiruna Sigera (2018–19) : H. D. D. Sigera
 Ayantha de Silva (2018–19) : A. S. de Silva
 Damitha Silva (2019–20 to 2022–23) : B. A. D. N. Silva
 D. K. G. A. A. Silva (2011–12 to 2012–13)
 K. S. D. Silva (2008–09 to 2021–22)
 Suranjith Silva (2006–07 to 2009–10) : S. H. S. M. K. Silva
 T. S. Silva (2008–09)
 W. A. A. M. Silva (2010–11 to 2011–12)
 Gayan Sirisoma (2006–07 to 2011–12) : R. M. G. K. Sirisoma
 Greg Smith (2012–13) : G. P. Smith
 S. Soysa (2005–06)
 G. C. K. M. Sumanathilaka (2018–19)
 Stephen Susa (2019–20) : I. S. Susa

References	
	
	
	
	
	
Lankan Cricket Club